Baalbek-Hermel is a governorate of Lebanon. It comprises the districts of Baalbek and Hermel, which in turn are subdivided into a total of 74 municipalities. The capital is at Baalbek. The governorate occupies the northern portion of the Beqaa Valley, Lebanon's most important agricultural area.

The UNHCR estimated the population of the governorate at 416,427 in 2015, including 137,788 registered refugees of the Syrian Civil War and 8,117 Palestinian refugees. The Lebanese citizen population is predominantly Shiite with pockets of Christians and Sunnis, while the refugee population is predominantly Sunni Muslims.

Baalbek-Hermel Governorate was created by the enactment of Law 522 on 16 July 2003, in which the districts of Baalbek and Hermel were separated from Beqaa Governorate. Implementation of the new region only began in 2014 with the appointment of the first and current governor, Bashir Khodr. 

Already one of Lebanon's poorest regions, the recent influx of Syrian refugees has placed additional strain on the governorate's fragile infrastructure and services. Violence in Syria has spilled over into the governorate, especially in the area around Arsal and Ras Baalbek. The northern Beqaa valley and Baalbek has had Hezbollah or the Amal Movement electoral victories but 46% of the electorate voted for the opposition Baalbek Madinati party in recent elections.

Gallery

References

 

Governorates of Lebanon
States and territories established in 2003
2003 establishments in Lebanon